Kyrtogymnodon is an extinct genus of prehistoric porcupinefish that lived during the Pliocene epoch of Europe.

See also

 Prehistoric fish
 List of prehistoric bony fish

References

Pliocene fish
Tetraodontiformes
Pliocene animals of Europe